Oakley Hall is an American folk rock band based in Brooklyn, New York.

The group was founded in 2002 and is named for Oakley Hall, an American novelist. The group's songs combine elements of rock, bluegrass, and old-time music, prominently featuring the male-female vocal harmonies of lead vocalists Patrick Sullivan and Rachel Cox.  Rather than imitating the style of commercial country or bluegrass, the group's melodies more closely recall old American folk songs and ballads, though often supported by a driving rock beat. In addition to the typical guitars, bass guitar, and drums, the group also features an electrified violin, an electric guitar tuned like a five-string banjo, and a lap steel guitar.

History

Although based in New York, most of the group's members are not originally from that state: Patrick Sullivan is from New England, Rachel Cox is from North Carolina, Jesse Barnes is from Maryland, Fred Wallace is from Mississippi, Claudia Mogel is from New York, and Greg Anderson is from Florida.  Sullivan is a former member of Oneida.

The above line-up was established in November 2004. Shortly after releasing the group's first album in 2005 their label Bulb Records went out of business, delaying the release of the second album Second Guessing. This led to only a brief pause between it and the release of their third effort, Gypsum Strings in 2006. Released on Oneida's label Brah Records, a subsidiary of Jagjaguwar, this was their first record to gain wide distribution, and the band toured extensively to support it in the United States, Canada, and Europe. In the spring of 2007 they toured alongside Bright Eyes, and signed to Merge Records. The fourth album, I'll Follow You, was released in September 2007.

In August 2007, drummer Greg Anderson was replaced by Pat Wood. In late 2007, while on tour with Cake, the band temporarily reduced to a quartet as Wallace and Mogel took a break. In January 2008 Ezra Oklan took over on drums.

In January 2008 the band performed "She Belongs to Me" as part of The Royal Albert Hall Project – the inaugural show of the 2008 New York Guitar Festival in the Winter Garden of the World Financial Center in NYC.

Recognition

I'll Follow You appeared in many 'Best-of-2007' lists including Time Out, the Washington Post
, and Harp
.

Members
Ezra Oklan – drums
Jesse Barnes – electric bass guitar, vocals
Rachel Cox – vocals, guitar
(Claudia Mogel – fiddle, vocals)
Patrick Sullivan – vocals, guitar, electric organ
(Fred Wallace – electric guitar (tuned like a banjo), lap steel)

Former members
Pat Wood – drums
Greg Anderson – drums
Leah Blesoff – guitar, vocals
Ted Southern – lap steel guitar
Will Dyar – drums
Steve Tesh – acoustic guitar, vocals
Ed Kurz – guitar

Discography

Studio albums
 Oakley Hall (2005), Bulb Records
 Second Guessing (2006), Amish Records
 Gypsum Strings (2006), Brah Records
 I'll Follow You (2007), Merge Records

EPs
 Sweet & Low (2003), self released

References

External links
Official website archive as of July 5, 2012.
Oakley Hall at Merge Records

Interviews
Oakley Hall interview Daytrotter, Sep 2 2006.
Podcast Hosted by Oakley Hall Soundcrank,  October 3, 2006. (mp3)

Video
PUNKCAST#507 Live @ Grand Press, Brooklyn – Jul 18 2004. (RealPlayer)
PUNKCAST#918 Live @ Union Pool, Brooklyn – Feb 4 2006. (RealPlayer, mp4)
PUNKCAST#1251 Live @ WFC Winter Garden, NYC – Jan 12 2008. (RealPlayer, mp4)

Musical groups established in 2002
Musical groups from Brooklyn
2002 establishments in New York City
Merge Records artists